Vukmanić is a village belonging to Karlovac in Croatia, population 207 (2011). It was the birthplace of Ivan Ribar who preceded Josip Broz Tito as post-World War II leader of Yugoslavia.

References

Populated places in Karlovac County